Heartbreak Ridge is a 1986 American war film produced and directed by Clint Eastwood, who also starred in the film. The film also co-stars Marsha Mason, Everett McGill, and Mario Van Peebles, and was released in the United States on December 5, 1986. The story centers on a U.S. Marine nearing retirement who gets a platoon of undisciplined Marines into shape and leads them during the American invasion of Grenada in 1983.

The title comes from the Battle of Heartbreak Ridge in the Korean War, where Eastwood's character had earned the Medal of Honor.

Plot
In 1983, Marine Corps Gunnery Sergeant Thomas Highway finagles a transfer back to his old unit, 2nd Reconnaissance Battalion, Second Marine Division. En route, he meets fellow passenger and aspiring rock musician Corporal "Stitch" Jones, who borrows money from Highway for a meal at a rest stop and then steals his bus ticket, leaving him stranded.

When Highway finally arrives, his new commanding officer, Major Malcolm Powers, seeing him as old-fashioned, assigns him to the Reconnaissance Platoon (part of his assault battalion) which by coincidence includes Jones. The platoon's previous sergeant, awaiting his retirement, had permitted their inactivity, but Highway quickly enacts a rigorous training program. Their desperate plan to intimidate him with resident body builder "Swede" Johanson, just released from the brig, fails after Highway easily overpowers Swede in a fight. Their conditioning provides positive results, and they develop esprit de corps and respect for Highway.

Highway repeatedly clashes with Powers and his assistant, First Platoon Staff Sergeant Webster. They deplore Highway's unorthodox training methods (such as firing an AK-47 over his men's heads to familiarize them with the weapon's distinctive sound). Seeing Highway's platoon as simply a training tool for a supposedly elite First Platoon, Powers proceeds to arrange for First Platoon to beat Highway's men in every field exercise. However, Highway's old comrade-in-arms, Sergeant Major Choozhoo, and his nominal superior officer, the college-educated and well-meaning but awkward and inexperienced First Lieutenant Ring, support him. After learning of his Medal of Honor award during the Korean War, Highway's men gain further respect for him, becoming unified against their perceived common enemy.

Highway attempts adapting his mindset to romance his ex-wife Aggie, a barmaid at a local tavern who is dating the establishment's Marine-hating owner, Roy. He resorts to reading women's magazines to attempt to understand the female mind. Initially resenting their failed marriage, Aggie tentatively reconciles with Highway. 

The 22nd Marine Amphibious Unit is then deployed for the invasion of Grenada. After a last-minute briefing on the amphibious assault ship , Highway's platoon mounts their UH-1 Huey and are dropped by helocast into the water before the rest of Powers' Battalion Landing Team. While advancing inland, they come under heavy enemy fire. Highway improvises, ordering Jones to provide cover using a bulldozer so they can advance and destroy an enemy machine gun nest. Their celebration after subsequently rescuing American students from a medical school is short-lived, as Choozhoo discovers that the Cubans are manning a key enemy position that will have to be taken to prevent further incidents. Powers, not wanting Highway to outdo him, orders the recon platoon to advance on the position, but not to attempt any engagement or take the position until First Platoon arrives.

Ring and Highway advance on the position, but come under heavy fire from two armored cars and infantry. The platoon hides inside an abandoned building, but when the Cubans attack, platoon radioman Profile is killed and his radio destroyed, impeding direct communication. Ring proposes making a long-distance call to Camp Lejeune for air support and sends Jones to repair the phone line before borrowing a credit card to complete the call, but enemy fire severs the line as he completes calling in the coordinates for an air-strike. Unsure if the call went through, Highway goes to put out a marker for the air support to locate the position, but is fired upon and knocked unconscious. Assuming that Highway is dead, the platoon exits the building to engage the Cubans, but then the air support arrives and repels the enemy. Ring and a revived Highway then disregard Powers' order, advance upon and take the position, and capture and detain the Cuban soldiers.

Major Powers arrives with Webster, reprimands Ring and threatens Highway with a court-martial. However, the commanding officer of the regiment to which Powers' battalion belongs, Colonel Meyers (a combat veteran who had served in the same battalion as Highway in the Vietnam War), arrives by helicopter and after listening to Powers' and Highway's reports, commends Highway and punishes Powers with transfer back to his former support unit for discouraging the Recon Marines' aggressive fighting spirit.

Highway and his men are warmly received upon returning to the States. Jones informs Highway that he is going to re-enlist and make a career in the Corps, while Highway confides to Jones he is taking mandatory retirement.

Cast

 Clint Eastwood as Gunnery Sergeant Tom Highway
 Marsha Mason as Aggie Highway
 Everett McGill as Major Malcolm A. Powers
 Moses Gunn as Staff Sergeant Luke Webster
 Eileen Heckart as Mary Jackson
 Mark Mattingly as Franco "One Ball" Peterson
 Bo Svenson as Roy Jennings
 Boyd Gaines as First Lieutenant M.R. Ring
 Mario Van Peebles as Corporal "Stitch" Jones
 Arlen Dean Snyder as Sergeant Major J. Choozhoo
 Vincent Irizarry as Lance Corporal Fragetti
 Ramón Franco as Lance Corporal Aponte (as Ramon Franco)
 Tom Villard as Corporal Profile
 Mike Gomez as Corporal Quinones
 Rodney Hill as Corporal Collins
 Peter Koch as Private "Swede" Johanson
 Richard Venture as Lieutenant Colonel Meyers
 Peter Jason as Major Devin
 John Hostetter as Officer Reese
 Nicholas Worth as Jail Binger
 J. C. Quinn as the supply Sergeant

Production
Screenwriter James Carabatsos, a Vietnam veteran of the 1st Cavalry Division, was inspired by an account of American paratroopers of the 82nd Airborne Division using a pay telephone and a credit card to call in fire support during the invasion of Grenada, and fashioned a script of a Korean War veteran career Army non-commissioned officer passing on his values to a new generation of soldiers. Eastwood was interested in the script and asked his producer, Fritz Manes, to contact the US Army with a view of filming the movie at Fort Bragg.

However, the Army read the script and refused to participate, due to Highway being portrayed as a hard drinker, divorced from his wife, and using unapproved motivational methods to his troops, an image the Army did not want. The Army called the character a "stereotype" of World War II and Korean War attitudes that did not exist in the modern army and also did not like the obscene dialogue and lack of reference to women in the army. Eastwood pleaded his case to an Army general, contending that while the point of the film was that Highway was a throwback to a previous generation, there were values in the World War II- and Korean War-era army that were worth emulating.

Eastwood approached the United States Marine Corps, which expressed some reservations about some parts of the film, but provided support. The character was then changed to a Marine. (This raised some conceptual difficulties, given that the Battle of Heartbreak Ridge primarily involved the Army. This is explained very briefly in the film when Sergeant Major Choozoo tells Stitch Jones that he and Highway were in the Army's 23rd Infantry Regiment at the time and "joined the Corps later"; the 23rd Regiment was at Heartbreak Ridge) The Marine Corps first cooperated with the film project by allowing much of the filming to be done at Camp Pendleton. The Marines planned to use it to promote its "Toys for Tots" campaign, but upon viewing a first cut, quickly disowned the film because of the language.

Marines who viewed the film cited numerous issues with the way they were portrayed. Major Powers, the battalion's inexperienced S-3 Operations Officer, is repeatedly shown disparaging and insulting Gunny Highway, as well as showing blatant favoritism regarding "his" Marines of the First Platoon. In reality, this would not have happened, given Highway's Medal of Honor. Much of the "training" done before the Grenada invasion was highly inaccurate, including the fact that Highway's Marine Recon unit did not have a Navy corpsman to deal with his men if injured. Even on a relatively small budget, the technical advice was poor. The Defense Department originally supported the film, but withdrew its backing after seeing a preview in November 1986. Eastwood was paid $6 million for directing and starring in the film.

Beginning in summer 1986, Heartbreak Ridge was filmed at Camp Talega (the location of the barracks), Chappo Flats (the location of the parachute rigging scene) and Mainside (the 1st Marine Division headquarters) on California's Camp Pendleton Marine Corps Base, the former campus of the San Diego Military Academy, SDMA Solana Beach and Puerto Rico's Vieques Island.

The sequence involving the bulldozer is based on a real event during the invasion of Grenada involving Army General John Abizaid, former commander of US Central Command. The American attack on Grenada is in some respects accurate, although it was really U.S. Army Rangers that secured the University Medical School. The scene in which Lieutenant Ring must resort to using a credit card in order to communicate with his commanders was also based on real-life events involving Army paratroopers.

The film was the 1000th to be released in Dolby Stereo.

Music

The film score was composed and conducted by American saxophonist Lennie Niehaus, who worked on over a dozen films for Eastwood. Actor Mario Van Peebles wrote the songs "Bionic Marine" and "Recon Rap", and co-wrote "I Love You (But I Ain't Stupid)" with Desmond Nakano.

Reception

Critical response

Reaction to the film was generally positive. Among reviews, Roger Ebert of the Chicago Sun Times, gave the film three stars and noted how the film has "as much energy and color as any action picture this year, and it contains truly amazing dialogue." Ebert also complimented director Eastwood mentioning how he "caresses the material as if he didn't know B movies have gone out of style." Marine." Another Washington Post staff writer, Rita Kempley, offered a different view, commenting that it was "always fun to see misguided machismo properly channeled into service of God, country or the National Hockey League. Isn't that the trouble with combat movies these days? From Top Gun to First Blood to Clint Eastwood's entertaining action drama Heartbreak Ridge, the empty-foxhole syndrome makes for non-endings." The staff at Variety added to the encouraging reviews, saying that the film "offers another vintage Clint Eastwood performance. There are enough mumbled half-liners in this contemporary war pic to satisfy those die-hards eager to see just how he portrays the consummate marine veteran." Vincent Canby of The New York Times expressed his satisfaction with the film, writing that "Eastwood's performance is one of the richest he's ever given. It's funny, laid-back, seemingly effortless, the sort that separates actors who are run-of-the-mill from those who have earned the right to be identified as stars."

In terms of negative feedback, reviewer Derek Smith of the Apollo Movie Guide wrote that there was "not enough substance to Gunny to make him interesting enough to be the central character of a film, and since the movie offers nothing new or fresh, it just feels dull and uninteresting."

Heartbreak Ridge holds a 68% rating on Rotten Tomatoes based on 28 reviews. The site's consensus states: "With Heartbreak Ridge, director Clint Eastwood gets one of his best performances out of himself, even if the story struggles to engage." On Metacritic, the film holds a weighted score of 53 out of 100 based on 16 reviews, indicating "mixed or average reviews". Audiences polled by CinemaScore gave the film an average grade of "B+" on an A+ to F scale.

Several writers have described the film as imperialist propaganda glorifying the American invasion of Grenada without explaining any of the history or politics surrounding it; the only information the audience is given about the war is that the Marines are rescuing American hostages and that there are Cubans on the enemy side. In Vietnam Images: War And Representation (1989), James Aulich and Jeffrey Walsh wrote that "Heartbreak Ridge dehistoricises actual political and economic conditions, omits many issues of imperialism or colonisation, and represents the Grenada events as a straightforward triumph of American manhood."

Accolades
The film won the BMI Film Music Award for Lennie Niehaus and the Image Award in the category of Outstanding Supporting Actor in a Motion Picture for Mario Van Peebles. The film also received a nomination, from the Academy Awards for Best Sound for Les Fresholtz, Dick Alexander, Vern Poore and Bill Nelson.

Box office
At its widest distribution in the U.S., the film was screened at 1,647 theaters grossing $8,100,840 in its opening weekend. During that first weekend, the film opened in second place behind Star Trek IV: The Voyage Home. Revenue dropped by 41% in its second week of release, earning $4,721,454. During its final weekend showing in theaters, the film grossed $1,040,729. It went on to take in a total of $42,724,017 in ticket sales during a seven-week theatrical run and a worldwide total of $121,700,000. It ranked 18th at the box office for 1986.

See also
 
 Clint Eastwood filmography

References

Bibliography

External links

 Official website
 Heartbreak Ridge at the Internet Movie Database
 Heartbreak Ridge at the Movie Review Query Engine
 
 
 

1986 films
1980s war films
American war films
1980s English-language films
Films about the United States Marine Corps
Films directed by Clint Eastwood
Films produced by Clint Eastwood
Films scored by Lennie Niehaus
Films set in Grenada
Films set in 1983
Malpaso Productions films
Warner Bros. films
1980s American films